Jamia Nusrathul Islam is an Islamic university in Kerala. This institution opened in 1997. It is located in Randathani, Malappuram in India. The foundation was laid by Islamic scholar O. K. Usthad. The university has more than 3000 students under institutes such as Dava and Sharea and junior Dava colleges ,and a special English medium school located at Poovanchina, Randathani, Malappuram. OK Usthad Research Center conducts academic conferences and is the major project of the university.

About the university
The society was established on July 28, 1997.

Administrators
 Cherussola Beeran Kutty Musliyar, Former President
 Ali Baqavi Attupuram, Chairman
 Dr. Hussain Randathani, Technical Secretary
 Shamsudheen saqafi sidheeqi, Dawa College Principal

Major institutes

 College of Dawa
 Shari'ath College
 Research Centre
 Madrassas
 SMILE charity foundation
 Nusrath secondary school
Lingo Hut
Oro Hub
Hope 
Nafeesathul Misriyya Quran Institute

References

External links
 

Islam in Kerala
Institutes of higher Islamic learning in Kerala